Maximus of Antioch was Bishop of Antioch between 182 AD or 188 AD and 191 AD. He is considered the eighth patriarch of Antioch, being the successor of Theophilus and predecessor of Serapion. According to Saint Jerome in De Viris Illustribus ("Concerning Illustrious Men"), Maximus wrote about the origin of evil and the creation of matter.

References 

Patriarchs of Antioch